Adriaan Cornelis Jasper Marius Alberga (14 February 1887 – 4 December 1952) was a Surinamese jurist. He served as Minister of Justice and Police from 1951 to 1952, and was Prime Minister of Suriname in 1952.

Biography
Alberga was born on 14 February 1887 in Paramaribo. After receiving his  (non-academic law degree), he started to work for the courts. In 1924, he became District Commissioner for Saramacca. In 1928, he retired and became a lawyer.

After the 1951 elections, Alberga was appointed Minister of Justice and Police of Suriname in the cabinet of Buiskool. After the resignation of Buiskool, he became Prime Minister of Suriname on 6 September 1952.

Alberga died in office on 4 December 1952, at the age of 65. Archibald Currie was appointed as his successor.

References 

1887 births
1952 deaths
Prime Ministers of Suriname
People from Paramaribo
20th-century Surinamese lawyers
Government ministers of Suriname